Pillow Creek is a creek in east-central British Columbia, Canada, located in the northeast corner of Wells Gray Provincial Park.

Pillow Creek is home to a subglacial volcano that formed and last erupted during the Pleistocene period.

See also
List of volcanoes in Canada
Volcanism of Canada
Volcanism of Western Canada

References

Rivers of British Columbia
Volcanoes of British Columbia
Pleistocene volcanoes
Monogenetic volcanoes